Sofía Álvarez may refer to:

 Sofía Álvarez (actress, born 1913) (1913–1985), Mexican film actress and singer of Colombian origin
 Sofía Álvarez (actress, born 1958) (born 1958), Mexican actress and writer
 Sofía Espinoza Álvarez (born 1989), Mexican-American author, researcher, and advocate
 Sofía Álvarez Vignoli (1899–1986), Uruguayan jurist and briefly First Lady of Uruguay
 Sofia Alvarez (writer), American playwright and screenwriter